This is a list of notable companies, networks, and organizations which are primarily known for the production and distribution of podcasts in both audio and video format. Although the accessibility of the medium means that many media, news, and radio organizations have produced podcasts, the scope of this list is concerned only with organizations and companies which are primarily involved with, or significantly known for, the production and distribution of podcasts.

Entries are organized alphabetically, with country of origin listed. Entries which are subsidiaries of other organizations have their parent organization noted.

A-G 
 Al Jazeera Podcasts – Al Jazeera Media Network, Qatar
 All Things Comedy – United States
 American Public Media
 Audacy – Audacy, Inc., United States
 AudioBoom – England
 audiochuck – United States
 BBC – England
 Cadence13 – Audacy, Inc., United States
 Canadaland – Canada
 Carolla Digital – United States
 Castbox – Hong Kong
 CBC Radio – Canada
 Crooked Media – United States
  – Germany
 The Daily Wire - United States
 Dixo – Mexico
 Earwolf – SiriusXM, United States
 ESPN Radio – The Walt Disney Company, United States
 Exactly Right Podcast Network, United States
 Feral Audio – defunct in 2017, United States
 Frequency Podcast Network – Rogers Media, Canada
 Frogpants Network – United States
 Generally Speaking Production Network – United States
 Gimlet Media – Spotify, United States

H-Q 
 HeadGum – United States
 Heritage Radio Network – United States
 Idle Thumbs – United States
 iHeartRadio – United States
 The Incomparable – United States
 Jupiter Broadcasting – United States
 Lemonada Media - United States
 Libsyn –  United States, Liberated Syndication, Inc.
 Luminary – United States
 Maximum Fun – United States
 Megaphone – Spotify, United States
 Nerdist Industries – United States
 New York Times Podcast – United States
 Night Vale Presents – United States
 NPR – United States
 Parcast – Spotify, United States
 Pineapple Street Studios, United States
 Play.it – Audacy, Inc., United States
 PodcastOne – United States
 Public Radio Exchange – United States
 QCode – United States

R-Z 
 Radiotopia – Public Radio Exchange, United States
 Realm Media - United States
 Relay FM – United States
 Revision3 – defunct in 2017, Discovery Digital Networks, United States
 The Ringer – Spotify, United States
 The Roost – Rooster Teeth & WarnerMedia, United States
 Slate – United States
 SortedFood – United Kingdom
 SModcast Podcast Network – United States
 Stitcher – United States
 TLV1 – Israel
 TWiT.tv – United States
 The Verge – United States
 Vox Media Podcast Network – United States
 Wall Street Journal Radio Network – United States
 WNYC Studios – New York Public Radio, United States
 Wondery – Amazon Music/Amazon, United States

References

Lists of companies
Podcasting lists